The Korean Alphabet Day, known as Hangeul Day in South Korea, and Chosŏn'gŭl Day in North Korea, is a national Korean commemorative day marking the invention and proclamation of Hangul, the Korean alphabet, by the 15th-century Korean King Sejong the Great. It is observed on October 9 in South Korea and January 15th in North Korea. Excluding the years 1990 to 2012, when the government maximized business days to expedite industrial growth, Hangul Day has been a national holiday in South Korea since 1970.

Synopsis
October 9th is dedicated to spreading information and use of Hangul. Because Hangul is one of the few writing systems where both the founder and the founding date are known, the day is also dedicated to commemorating the achievements of King Sejong. The Government of South Korea legislated an amendment regarding the holiday:

The holiday is celebrated in both South and North Korea. In the south the holiday is formally known as Hangeul Proclamation Day, or Hangeul Day for short, and is celebrated on October 9 to commemorate the promulgation of the Hunminjeongeum on October 9, 1446. In the north the holiday is formally known as Chosŏn'gŭl Day, and is celebrated on January 15 to commemorate the creation of the Hunminjeongeum on January 15, 1444.

The Yanbian Korean Autonomous Prefecture in China has also designated September 2nd as the official "Day of the Korean Language" since 2014.

History

Before the creation of Hangul, people in Korea (known as Joseon at the time) primarily wrote using Classical Chinese alongside native phonetic writing systems that predated Hangul by hundreds of years, including idu, hyangchal, gugyeol, and gakpil. However, due to the fundamental differences between the Korean and Chinese languages, and the large number of characters needed to be learned, there was much difficulty in learning how to write using Chinese characters for the lower classes, who often didn't have the privilege of education. To assuage this problem, King Sejong created the unique alphabet known as Hangul to promote literacy among the common people. Hangul Proclamation Day has been celebrated annually in South Korea on October 9 since 1970. However, this does not include the period from 1990 to 2012 since people were required to work for their businesses on this day instead of taking time off. It is also celebrated in North Korea on January 15. Despite all of Hangul’s benefits, it nearly went out of existence during the Joseon dynasty. The elite of the time wanting to preserve their status saw Chinese characters as the only true way to write Korean.  In the early 16th century, Hangul was effectively banned by the king. However, Hangul had a resurgence in the 19th century, and gradually grew more and more common, especially due to its role in Korean nationalism during the era of Japanese occupation. By the 1970s the use of Chinese characters declined, and these days, almost all Korean is written in Hangul. 

According to the Sejong Sillok, King Sejong proclaimed publication of Hunmin Jeongeum, the document introducing the newly created alphabet which was also originally called by the same name, in the ninth month of the lunar calendar in 1446. In 1926, the Korean Language Society, whose goal was to preserve the Korean language during a time of rapid forced Japanization, celebrated the octosexigesimal (68th) anniversary of the declaration of hangeul on the last day of the ninth month of the lunar calendar, which is on November 4 of the Gregorian calendar. Members of the Society declared it the first observance of "Gagyanal". The name came from "Gagyageul", an early colloquial name for hangeul, based on a mnemonic recitation beginning "gagya geogyeo...". The name of the commemorative day was changed to "Hangullal" in 1928, soon after the term "hangul", coined originally in 1913 by Ju Sigyeong, became widely accepted as the new name for the alphabet. The day was then celebrated according to the lunar calendar.

In 1931, the celebration of the day was switched to October 29 of the Gregorian Calendar, the calendar which is in contemporary use. Three years later, the date was moved to October 28, to coordinate the date with that of the Julian Calendar, which had been in use during the 15th century, when King Sejong had made his proclamation.

The discovery in 1940 of an original copy of the Hunmin Jeongeum Haerye, a volume of commentary to the Hunmin Jeongeum that appeared not long after the document it commented upon, revealed that the Hunmin Jeongeum was announced during the first ten days (sangsun) of the ninth month. The tenth day of the ninth month of the 1446 lunar calendar was equivalent to October 9 of that same year's Julian calendar. The South Korean government, established in 1945, declared October 9 to be Hangeul Day, a yearly legal holiday which excused government employees from work.

Major employers pressured the South Korean government to increase the country's annual number of work days. In 1991, to balance out the adoption of the United Nations Day, it vacated Hangeul Day's status as a holiday. By law, Hangeul Day remained a national commemoration day, and the Hangeul Society campaigned for the holiday's restoration. On November 1, 2012, the Society won that campaign, when the National Assembly voted 189 to 4 (with 4 abstaining) in favor of a resolution that called for the return of Hangeul Day as a national holiday. This put pressure on the Lee Myung Bak administration, which applied the change in 2013.

Celebrations
In 2009, a heavy bronze Statue of King Sejong was revealed to the public  Sejongno, Gwanghwamun Plaza in central Seoul, South Korea. It towers over citizens and tourists at approximately 20 feet. Underneath the large golden statue there is a museum, which many people visit on Hangul Day. Inside the museum there are many exhibits explaining the creation of the language and technological advancements made during King Sejong's reign.

See also

 Public holidays in North Korea
 Public holidays in South Korea
 Korean alphabet
 Yeominrak
 Hangul supremacy

References

External links
 Hangeul Day at Language Log

Korean language
Korean culture
Hangul
Language observances
January observances
October observances
Public holidays in South Korea
Public holidays in North Korea
Winter events in North Korea
Autumn events in South Korea